The Balikun horse is a light horse breed from China, used for riding, light draft, and pack work.

Characteristics 
They have heavy heads with small ears; the neck is thick, short, and well muscled; withers may be somewhat low; the back is short, flat, and very strong; the croup is sloped with a low-set tail. The shoulder is somewhat straight but muscular. This breed has powerful quarters and strong legs with good feet. The coat is very dense and thick, and the Balikun is able to live on steppe pasture, even at temperatures under -40F.

Breed history 
The Balikun comes from the Xinjiang Autonomous Region of China, and descends from Kazakh and Mongolian horses. In selective breeding for over 200 years, the Balikun became a special breed.

Uses 
This pony is very tough and well adapted to its habitat, which is frequently harsh. It is used extensively in the area for transport, but is also used as a light riding and draft pony. The Balikun can easily carry a pack weighing 220 pounds up to fifty miles in a day. It is considered a native breed in China.

References

Horse breeds
Horse breeds originating in China